The Franklin Local Board is one of the 21 local boards of the Auckland Council. It is overseen by the Franklin ward councillor.

The Franklin Local Board area spans the full width of the North Island, from the Hauraki Gulf to the Manukau Harbour. It includes the Hunua Ranges.

Andrew Baker is the current chair of the board.

Demographics

2019–2022 term
The board members, elected at the 2019 local body elections, in election order, are:
Alan Cole, Team Franklin, (5633 votes)
Andy Baker, Team Franklin, (5166 votes)
Amanda Kinzett, Team Franklin, (3803 votes)
Angela Fulljames, Team Franklin, (3546 votes)
Logan Soole, Team Franklin, (3093 votes)
Sharlene Druyven, Team Franklin, (3048 votes)
Malcolm Bell, not affiliated, (2971 votes)
Lance Gedge, Independent, (2886 votes)
Matthew Murphy, Waiuku First, (1640 votes)

2016–2019 term
The 2016–2019 board consisted of:
Angela Fulljames (chair)
Andy Baker (deputy chair)
Malcolm Bell
Alan Cole
Brendon Crompton
Sharlene Druyven
Amanda Hopkins
Murray Kay
Niko Kloeten

References

Franklin Local Board Area
Local boards of the Auckland Region